Esmé Valerie Eliot (née Fletcher; 17 August 19269 November 2012) was the second wife and later widow of the Nobel prize-winning poet T. S. Eliot. She was a major stockholder in the publishing firm of Faber and Faber Limited and the editor and annotator of a number of books dealing with her late husband's writings.

Early life
The daughter of an insurance manager in Leeds, she was educated at Queen Anne's School, Caversham, where she was reputed to have told her headteacher that she knew precisely what she wanted to become: secretary to T.S. Eliot.

Personal life
Valerie married Eliot, almost 40 years her senior, on 10 January 1957. She had been a star-struck fan of Eliot since her schooldays (at the age of 14, on hearing John Gielgud read The Journey of the Magi), as she confided to the novelist Charles Morgan, for whom she worked as a secretary. Morgan used his influence to get her a job at Faber and Faber, where she finally met Eliot in August 1949, a debt of kindness which she always acknowledged.

In a 1994 interview with The Independent, she recalled a very ordinary life of evenings spent at home playing Scrabble and eating cheese, stating "He obviously needed a happy marriage. He wouldn't die until he'd had it."

Following T.S. Eliot's 1965 death, Valerie was his most important editor and literary executor, having brought to press The Waste Land: Facsimile and Manuscripts of the Original Drafts (1971) and  The Letters of T.S. Eliot: Volume 1, 1898–1922 (1989). She assisted Christopher Ricks with his edition of The Inventions of the March Hare (1996), a volume of Eliot's unpublished verse. A long-delayed second volume of T.S. Eliot's letters was also edited by her.

One of Valerie Eliot's most lucrative decisions as executor was granting permission for a stage musical to be based on her husband's work Old Possum's Book of Practical Cats. This became the hit Andrew Lloyd Webber musical Cats. With her portion of the proceeds Valerie Eliot established "Old Possum's Practical Trust" – a literary registered charity – and funded the T.S. Eliot Prize, given annually and worth £15,000.

At the 1983 Tony Awards, Valerie Eliot accepted her husband's posthumous Tony Award for Best Book of a Musical for Cats.

In late 2009, the second volume of Eliot's letters was published. The third volume, edited by Valerie Eliot and John Haffenden, followed in July 2012.

Valerie Eliot died on 9 November 2012 at her home in London. She was 86 years old.

She was a godparent to Marcus du Sautoy.

References

External links
Old Possum's Practical Trust
McCrum, Robert. "TS Eliot – the secret passion", The Observer.
"The Two Mrs Eliots", The Independent.
Narita, Tatsushi. "My Visit with Mrs. T.S. Eliot (Valerie Eliot) at the Kensington Home".

1926 births
2012 deaths
T. S. Eliot
Fellows of Newnham College, Cambridge
People from Leeds
British book editors
British literary editors
People educated at Queen Anne's School